Lespesia is a genus of flies in the family Tachinidae.

Species
Lespesia affinis (Townsend, 1927)
Lespesia afra (Wulp, 1890)
Lespesia aletiae (Riley, 1879)
Lespesia andina (Bigot, 1888)
Lespesia anisotae (Webber, 1930)
Lespesia apicalis (Wulp, 1890)
Lespesia archippivora (Riley, 1871)
Lespesia auriceps (Macquart, 1844)
Lespesia barbatula (Wulp, 1890)
Lespesia bigeminata (Curran, 1927)
Lespesia callosamiae Beneway, 1963
Lespesia chrysocephala (Walker, 1836)
Lespesia clavipalpis Thompson, 1966
Lespesia cuculliae (Webber, 1930)
Lespesia danai (Townsend, 1940)
Lespesia datanarum (Townsend, 1892)
Lespesia erythrocauda (Curran, 1934)
Lespesia euchaetiae (Webber, 1930)
Lespesia fasciagaster Beneway, 1963
Lespesia ferruginea (Reinhard, 1924)
Lespesia flavicans (Wulp, 1890)
Lespesia flavifrons Beneway, 1963
Lespesia frenchii (Williston, 1889)
Lespesia giovannae Toma, 2010.
Lespesia halisidotae (Aldrich & Webber, 1924)
Lespesia lanei Guimarães, 1983
Lespesia laniiferae (Webber, 1930)
Lespesia lata (Wiedemann, 1830)
Lespesia leliae Cortés & Campos, 1971
Lespesia marginalis (Aldrich & Webber, 1924)
Lespesia martinezi (Brèthes, 1917)
Lespesia melalophae (Allen, 1926)
Lespesia melloi Gil-Santana, Nihei & Nunez, 2014
Lespesia modestus (Bigot, 1857)
Lespesia monensis (Curran, 1926)
Lespesia nigripalpis (Aldrich, 1932)
Lespesia nimia Cortés & Campos, 1971
Lespesia obscurus (Bigot, 1857)
Lespesia oscari Toma, 2010
Lespesia parva Beneway, 1963
Lespesia parviteres (Aldrich & Webber, 1924)
Lespesia pholi (Webber, 1930)
Lespesia pilatei (Coquillett, 1897)
Lespesia plaumanni Guimarães, 1983
Lespesia pluto (Curran, 1934)
Lespesia pollinosa Thompson, 1966
Lespesia postica (Walker, 1861)
Lespesia protoginoi (Blanchard, 1966)
Lespesia pumila (Wulp, 1890)
Lespesia rectinervis (Wulp, 1890)
Lespesia rileyi (Williston, 1889)
Lespesia robusta (Aldrich, 1934)
Lespesia rubra (Townsend, 1916)
Lespesia rubripes Sabrosky, 1980
Lespesia rufifrons (von Röder, 1885)
Lespesia rufomaculata (Blanchard, 1963)
Lespesia sabroskyi Beneway, 1963
Lespesia samiae (Webber, 1930)
Lespesia schizurae (Townsend, 1891)
Lespesia spitzi Guimarães, 1983
Lespesia stonei Sabrosky, 1977
Lespesia teixeirai Guimarães, 1983
Lespesia testacea (Webber, 1930)
Lespesia texana (Webber, 1930)
Lespesia travassosi Guimarães, 1983
Lespesia westonia (Webber, 1930)
Lespesia williamsoni (Blanchard, 1959)
Lespesia xychus (Walker, 1849)

References

Diptera of South America
Diptera of North America
Exoristinae
Tachinidae genera
Taxa named by Jean-Baptiste Robineau-Desvoidy